Passiflora sanguinolenta, common name blood red passion flower, is a species of passion flower from Ecuador.

References

 Species entry on Tropicos.org

sanguinolenta